George Henry Smith (born 6 June 1901, date of death unknown) was an English-born footballer of the 1920s who played as a left-back.

Biography
Smith was born in Netherton and began his career with Chelsea, but left there and his next club Gillingham without making a league appearance. He then joined Walsall, for whom he made his first competitive appearance in 1924–25, and went on to play 92 league matches for them.

He joined Torquay United for the 1927–28 season and later played for Exmouth Town and Newton Abbot Spurs.

References

1901 births
Year of death missing
English Football League players
Chelsea F.C. players
Gillingham F.C. players
Walsall F.C. players
Torquay United F.C. players
Exmouth Town F.C. players
Newton Abbot Spurs A.F.C. players
Place of death missing
Association football fullbacks
English footballers